General Löwenhielm may refer to:

Carl Gustaf Löwenhielm (1790–1858), Swedish Army lieutenant general
Carl Löwenhielm (1772–1861), Swedish Army lieutenant general
Gustaf Löwenhielm (1771–1856), Swedish Army general